208 (two hundred [and] eight) is the natural number following 207 and preceding 209. 

208 is a practical number,
a tetranacci number, a rhombic matchstick number, a happy number, and a member of Aronson's sequence.
There are exactly 208 five-bead necklaces drawn from a set of beads with four colors,
and 208 generalized weak orders on three labeled points.

References

Integers